André de Leones (born 1980 in Goiânia) is a Brazilian novelist.

He was born in Goiânia and grew up in Silvânia, in the inner state of Goiás, Brazil. His home town frequently appears in his novels.

He was the winner of the 2005 Prêmio Sesc de Literatura for his debut novel Hoje Está um Dia Morto. Leones has released five more novels and a short story collection and has been published in several short story anthologies. He has a Bachelor's degree in Philosophy by the Pontifical Catholic University of São Paulo and has also written about literature for Brazilian newspapers and magazines.

Works
His short story (and a novella) collection Paz na Terra Entre os Monstros followed shortly after his debut. His third novel, Dentes Negros, was released in 2011. The novel is about a fictitious apocalypse and its aftermath. In 2013 he released Terra de Casas Vazias. The novel was granted the Programa Petrobras Cultural sponsorship. His following novel, Abaixo do Paraíso, was considered by the newspaper O Globo one of the best fiction books published in 2016. Eufrates, his latest novel, was shortlisted for the 2019 São Paulo Prize for Literature and longlisted for the Oceanos and Jabuti literary prizes.

He lives in São Paulo since 2010.

Novels
(2006) Hoje Está um Dia Morto (Today is a Dead Day)
(2010) Como Desaparecer Completamente (How to Disappear Completely)
(2011) Dentes Negros (Black Teeth)
(2013) Terra de Casas Vazias (Land of Empty Houses)
(2016) Abaixo do Paraíso (Below Heaven)
(2018) Eufrates

Short story
(2008) "Paz na Terra Entre os Monstros" (Peace on Earth Amongst the Monsters)

External links

References

1980 births
Living people
People from Goiânia
Brazilian male short story writers
21st-century Brazilian short story writers
21st-century Brazilian novelists
21st-century Brazilian male writers
Brazilian male novelists